Bryantsburg is an unincorporated community in Buchanan County, Iowa, United States. It is located on Highway 150 north of Independence and south of Hazleton, at 42.579132N, -91.905063W.

History
 
Founded in the 19th century, Bryantsburg was once home to a bank, schools, and a post office. The post office was closed by 1925. 

Bryantsburg was on the Chicago, Rock Island, and Pacific Railroad, which operated until 1980.

Bryantsburg's population was 41 in 1902, and 52 in 1925.

Many Amish families now live in the Bryantsburg area.

References

Unincorporated communities in Buchanan County, Iowa
Unincorporated communities in Iowa